Kinards (also Kinard) is an unincorporated community in Laurens and Newberry counties in the U.S. state of South Carolina.  It had a post office that now is closed permanently, with the ZIP Code of 29355.  Kinards was first established as Kinards Turnout when the post office opened February 26, 1856. The population of the ZCTA for ZIP Code 29355 was 801 at the 2000 census.

References

Unincorporated communities in Laurens County, South Carolina
Unincorporated communities in Newberry County, South Carolina
Unincorporated communities in South Carolina
Upstate South Carolina 
Columbia metropolitan area (South Carolina)